

The RBC Canadian Painting Competition was an open competition for emerging Canadian artists that was established in 1999. The RBC Canadian Painting Competition is supported by the Canadian Art Foundation, the publisher of Canadian Art (magazine). Initially naming three regional winners, since 2004 there were one national winner and two honourable mentions. The first two competitions had only winner and runner-up. The competition had 15 finalists, five from three regions in Canada, Eastern Canada (Quebec, Nova Scotia, New Brunswick, PEI, Newfoundland and Labrador), Central Canada (Ontario), Western Canada (Manitoba, Saskatchewan, Alberta, British Columbia, Yukon, Northwest Territories, Nunavut). Three regional juries convened to determine one national winner and two honourable mentions from the 15 finalists. The national winner received a purchase prize of $25,000, the two honourable mentions each received $15,000 and the remaining 12 finalists receive $2,500 each. The winning work and the honourable mentions became part of the RBC Corporate Art Collection which holds more than 4,500 works. In 2016, 586 works were submitted. In 2008 an exhibition at the National Gallery of Canada in Ottawa and the Musée d'art contemporain de Montréal provided an overview of the first ten years of the competition. The RBC concluded the RBC Canadian Painting Competition in 2019.

1999 
Canadian Emerging Artist Prize
 Winner: Jennifer Walton
 Runner-up: Jeff Willmore

Jury 
 Bill Huffman
 James Patten

2000 
Canadian Emerging Artist Prize
 Winner: Matthew Carver
 Runner-up: Catherine Beaudette

Jury 
 Andrea Bolley
 Gary Michael Dault
 Bill Huffman
 David P. Solcox
 Carl Skelton
In 2001 the prize was renamed to RBC Canadian Painting Competition, and three regional winners were selected.

2001

Finalists

Western 
 Brigitte Dion
 Kristina Kudryk
 Sharron Labatt
 Gwenessa Lam
 Ben Reeves (Regional Winner)

Central 
 Mona Shahid
 Patrice Stanley 
 Marian Wihak
 Regina Williams (Regional Winner) 
 Shaan Syed (finalist 2003, 2004)

Eastern 
 Reneé Duval
 Eric Le Ménédeu (Regional Winner ) 
 Joanne Poirier
 Fionnuala Reynolds
 Joseph Siddiqi

Jury

Western 
 Robin Laurence
 Tracey Lawrence (gallerist) 
 Christina Ritchie

Central 
 Gillian MacKay
 Aaron Milrad
 Pari Nadimi

Eastern 
 Alex Colville
 Jerry Ferguson
 Jan Peacock

2002

Finalists

Western 
 Chris Bennet (Regional Winner) 
 Brigitte Dion
 Holger Kalberg (finalist 2005 and jury 2013)
 Séamus Kealy
Bernadette Phan

Central 
 Melissa Doherty
 Danny Hussey
 JJ Lee (Regional Winner)
 Mary McKenzie
 Kelly Palmer

Eastern 
 Carmelo Blandino
 Dennis Eksted (Regional Winner)
 Camille Girard-Ruel
 Asa Johnna Westin

Jury

Western 
 Chris Cran
 Catherine Crowston
 Mary Scott

Central 
 Eliza Griffiths
 Leo Kamen
 Kitty Scott

Eastern 
 Stéphane Aquin
 Roger Bellemare
 Janet Werner

2003

Finalists

Western 
 Chris Dorosz (Regional winner)
 July Duschenes
 Cliff Eyland
 Val Nelson
 Jeff Tutt

Central 
 Martin Bennett
 Jordan Broadworth
 Chris Rogers (Regional winner)
 Shaan Syed (finalist 2001, 2004)
 Pearl Van Geest

Eastern 
 Martin Brouillette
 Peter Dykhuis (Regional winner)
 Caroline Gagnon
 Robert Truszkowski
 Marilyn McAvoy

Jury

Western 
 Bob Boyer
 Wanda Koop
 Paul Kuhn

Central 
 Robin Metcalfe
 Sarah Milroy
 Kim Moodie
 Joanne Tod

Eastern 
 Jocelyne Aumon
 Ingrid Jenkner
 Jeffrey Spalding
Revised in 2004 to name five finalists per region, one national winner and two regional winners.

2004

Finalists

Western 
 Monique Blom
 John Eisler
 Mark Mullin
 Jim Park
 Brad Phillips (Regional winner)

Central 
 Andrew Morrow 
 Soheila Esfahani
 Alexander Irving
 Dionne Simpson (National Winner)
 Shaan Syed (finalist 2001, 2003)

Eastern 
 Adele Chong
 Jennifer Dorner
 Patrick Lundeen
 Andrea Mortson
 Laurel Smith (Regional winner)

Jury

Western 
 Kent Archer, director and curator, Kenderdine Art Gallery Saskatoon, SK 
 Riko Nakasone
 Jane Ash Poitras

Central 
 Jan Allen
 Will Gorlitz
 Olga Korper

Eastern 
 Pierre Dorion (jury 2008)
 Gemey Kelly
 Gordon Laurin

2005

Finalists

Western 
 Chris Millar (finalist 2007)
 Matthew Brown
 Holger Kalberg (jury 2013)
 Krisdy Shindler
 Étienne Zack (National winner, jury 2009)

Central 
 Chris Down
 Jason Gringler
 Meghan McKnight 
 Kristine Moran (Regional winner)
 Nick Ostoff

Eastern 
 Paul Berhardt
 Yang Hong
 Chris Kline
 Wil Murray
 Mathew Reichertz (Regional winner)

Jury

Western 
 Lisa Baldissera
 Yves Trépanier
 Landon MacKenzie

Central 
 Shirley Madill
 Linda Book
 Ben Reeves

Eastern 
 Marc Mayer
 René Blouin
 Alex Livingston

2006

Finalists

Western 
 Abbas Akhavan
 Matthew Brown (Regional Winner)
 Dave & Jenn
 Holger Kalberg (jury 2015)
Mélanie Rocan Honourable mention

Central 
 Adam Brickell (Regional winner)
 Kim Dorland
 Martin Golland (finalist 2008, 2009)
 Dax Morrison
 Fançois Xavier Saint-Pierre

Eastern 
 Nicolas Grenier
 Dil Hildebrand (National Winner)
 Jonathan Johnson
 Daniel Langevin
 Luce Meunier

Jury

Western 
 Wayne Baerwaldt
 Eleanor Bond
 Andy Sylvester

Central 
 John Brown
 Barbara Fischer
 Patrizia Libralato

Eastern 
 Shauna McCabe
 Lilian Rodriguez
 Eric Simon
Naming one national winner and two honourable mentions rather than regional winners started in 2007

2007

Finalists

Western 
 Eli Bornowsky (finalist 2008, 2010)
 Arabella Campbell (National Winner)
 Angus Ferguson
 Saun Morin
 Chris Millar (Honourable mention, finalist 2005)

Central 
 Melanie Authier (honourable mention)
 Kim Dorland
 Jennifer Lefort
 Anders Oinonen
 Ben Pinkney

Eastern 
 Elizabeth Grant
 Nam Nguyen
 Aleksandra Rdest
Mélanie Rocan
 Justin Stephens

Jury

Western 
 Paul Butler
Ron Moppett
 Reid Sheir

Central 
 John Hartman
 Ben Portis
 Mary Sue Rankin

Eastern 
 Peter Dykhuis
 Pierre-François Ouelette
 Michele Thériault

2008

Finalists

Western 
 Eli Bornowsky (finalist 2007, 2010)
 Andrew Dadson
 Jeremy Hof (National winner)
 Collin Johanson
 Lorenzo Pepito

Central 
 Martin Golland (finalist 2006)
 Sarah Jane Gorliz
 Amanda Reeves (Honourable mention)
 Drew Simpson
 Emmy Skensved

Eastern 
 Patrick Howlett
 Rick Leong
 Wil Murray (Honourable Mention, Finalist 2005)
 Jeanie Riddle
 Justin Stephens

Jury

Western 
 Neil Campbell
 Monte Clarke
 Kitty Scott

Central 
 Jessica Bradley
 James Lahey
 David Liss

Eastern 
 James Baird
 Loise Déry
 Pierre Dorion (jury 2004)

2009

Finalists

Western Canada 
 Noah Becker – Victoria
 Brenda Draney (National winner) – Vancouver, BC for Aim is Important
 Dave & Jenn – Calgary
 Ryan Peter – Vancouver
 Joseph Tisiga – Whitehorse

Central Canada 
 Sarah Cale – Toronto
 Janice Colbert – Toronto
 Scott Everingham – Toronto
 Martin Golland (Honourable mention, finalist 2006, 2008) – Toronto, ON for Residential Night Vulture
 Sasha Pierce (Honourable mention) – Toronto, ON Brown

Eastern Canada 
 Julie Beugin – Montreal
 Anthony Burnham – Montreal
 Pierre Durette – Montreal
 Daniel Hutchinson – Halifax
 Nathalie Thibault – Quebec

Jury

Western 
 Ken Lum, Artist, Vancouver
 Nancy Tousley, Senior Art Writer, Calgary Herald
 Kathleen Ritter, Assistant Curator, Vancouver Art Gallery

Central 
 Benjamin Diaz, Director, Diaz Contemporary, Toronto
 Josée Drouin-Brisebois, Curator, Contemporary Art, National Gallery of Canada
 John Kissick, Artist & Director, School of Fine Art and Music, University of Guelph

Eastern 
 Victoria Page, Owner, Gallery Page and Strange, Halifax
 Nathalie de Blois, Curator of Contemporary Art, Musée national des beaux-arts du Québec
 Etienne Zack, (winner 2005) Artist, Montreal

2010

Finalists

Western 
 Eli Bornowsky (finalist 2007, 2008, jury 2015) – Vancouver
 Aaron Carpenter – Vancouver
 Megan Hepburn – Vancouver
 Laura Piasta – Coquitlam
Melanie Rocan – Winnipeg

Central 
 Sarah Cale – Toronto
 Scott Everingham – Toronto
 Jon Reed (Honourable mention) – Toronto, ON for Stato di Impotenza
 Mark Stebbins (Honourable mention) – Toronto, ON for Data Centers'
 Beth Stuart (finalist 2011,  jury 2016) – Toronto

 Eastern 
 Hugo Bergeron – Montreal
 Scott Bertram – Halifax
 Benjamin Klein – Montreal
 Alexis Lavoie (National Winner) – Montreal, QC for Restants Rick Leong – Montreal

 Jury 
 Western 
 Renée Van Halm, Vancouver artist 
 Jennifer Papararo, curator at the Contemporary Art Gallery in Vancouver
 Mary Reid, curator of contemporary art and photography at the Winnipeg Art Gallery.

 Central 
 Joe Friday, Ottawa collector 
 Joanne Tod, Toronto artist 
 Michael Gibson, director of Michael Gibson Gallery,  London, ON

 Eastern 
 Mathew Reichertz, artist, Halifax 
 Simon Blais, owner Galerie Simon Blais, Montreal
 Paulette Gagnon, director of the Musée d’art contemporain de Montréal

 2011 
 Finalists 
Western Canada
 Rebecca Brewer (National Winner) – Vancouver, BC for Beuys painting Thomas Chisholm – Victoria, BC
 Bitsy Knox – Vancouver, BC
 Deirdre McAdams (Honourable Mention) – Vancouver, BC for Blotto Krisjanis Katkins-Gorsline – Winnipeg, MB

Central Canada
 Jessica Groome – Guelph, ON
 Tristram Lansdowne – Toronto, ON
 Daniel Hutchinson – Toronto, ON
 Kim Neudorf – London, ON
 Beth Stuart (Honourable mention, finalist 2010, jury 2016) – Toronto, ON for 02, from Doppelbanger seriesEastern Canada
 Julie Trudel – Montreal, PQ
 Amy Schissel – Gatineau, PQ
 Jared Peters – Saint John, NB
 Ianick Raymond – Montreal, PQ
 Adam Gunn – Halifax, NS  (2013 finalist)

 Jury 
 Western 
 Elizabeth McIntosh, Senior Artist and Associate Professor, Emily Carr University, Vancouver
 Bruce Grenville, Senior Curator, Vancouver Art Gallery, Vancouver
 Diana Sherlock, Curator & Visual Arts Writer, Calgary

 Central 
 Elizabeth Smith, Executive Director of Curatorial Affairs, Art Gallery of Ontario, Toronto
 Christopher Cutts, Director, Christopher Cutts Gallery, Toronto 
 Patrick Howlett, (finalist 2008) Senior Artist, London

 Eastern 
 Donald Browne, Director, Galerie Donald Browne, Montreal
 Suzanne Funnell, Associate Professor, NSCAD University, Halifax
 Francois LeTourneux, Associate Curator, Musée d’art contemporain de Montréal, Montreal

 2012 
 Finalists 
 Betino Assa – Montreal, QC
 Ahbyah Baker – Vancouver
 Thomas Chisholm – Victoria
 Jordy Hamilton – Vancouver
 Andrea Kastner – Edmonton
 Katie Lyle (Honourable mention) – Vancouver, BC for White Night Central 
Colin Muir Dorward – Ottawa
Aleksander Hardashnakov – Toronto 
David Hucal  – Guelph
Vanessa Maltese (National winner) – Toronto, ON for BalaclavaJenna Faye Powell (Sarnia).

 Eastern 
 Betino Assa (Honourable mention) –  Montreal for Gathering in the forest, 12 am Philip Delisle (Halifax)
 Nicolas Rancellucci (Montreal)
 Corri-Lynn Tetz (Montreal)
 Julie Trudel (Montreal).

 Jury 
Western Canada
 Sandra Meigs - Senior Artist and Professor of Fine Arts, University of Victoria, Victoria
 Mark Mullin - Senior Artist, Calgary
 Nigel Prince, executive director of the Contemporary Art Gallery in Vancouver
Central Canada
 Clint Roenisch - Founder, Clint Roenisch Gallery, Toronto
 Jonathan Shaughnessy – associate curator, contemporary art at the National Gallery of Canada
 Monica Tap - Senior Artist and Associate Professor, University of Guelph, Guelph
Eastern Canada
 Roger Bellemare - Gallery Director, Galerie Roger Bellemare, Montreal
 Robin Metcalfe - Director and Curator, Saint Mary's University Art Gallery, Halifax
 Janet Werner - Senior Artist, Montreal (2002 jury)

 2013 
 Finalists 
Western Canada
 Jessica Bell – Vancouver 
 Colleen Heslin (National winner) – Vancouver for Almost young, wild and free, 2013
 Brian Kokoska (2016 finalist ) – Vancouver/New York
 Rachelle Sawatsky – Vancouver/Los Angeles
 Sean Weisgerber – Saskatoon

Central Canada
 Jennifer Carvalho – Toronto
 Colin Muir Dorward –  (Honourable mention, 2012 finalist) Ottawa, ON for  Labyrinthineon, 2012
 Scott Everingham – Toronto (2010 finalist)
 Laura Findlay – Guelph, Ont.
 Neil Harrison (Honourable mention) – Toronto, ON for Fig.13 Knowledge, 2013

Eastern Canada
 Brendan Flanagan – Montreal
 Adam Gunn – Halifax (2011 finalist)
 Nathaniel Hurtubise – Montreal
 Jessica Mensch – Montreal/Brooklyn, N.Y.
 Aaron Weldon – Halifax

 Jury 
Western Canada
 Ian Wallace - Senior Artist, Vancouver
 Holger Kalberg (finalist 2005) - Artist and Assistant Professor, University of Manitoba, Winnipeg
 Ryan Doherty - Curator, Southern Alberta Art Gallery, Lethbridge

Central Canada
 Sarah Milroy - Art critic, Toronto
 Daniel Faria - Gallery Director, Daniel Faria Gallery, Toronto
 Carol Wainio - Artist and Adjunct Professor, University of Ottawa, Ottawa

 Eastern Canada 
 Stéphane Aquin – curator of contemporary art Musée des beaux-arts de Montréal 
 Pan Wendt – curator Confederation Centre Art Gallery
 Isa Tousignant – writer and editor

 2014 
 Finalists 
 Western Canada 
 Ashleigh Bartlett – Calgary, AB for Ballet Duo Ufuk Gueray (Honourable mention) - Winnipeg, MB for Market, 2014 B
Tiziana La Melia (National winner) – Vancouver, BC for Hanging on to the part, 2014
 Laura Piasta – Vancouver, BC
 Robert Taite – Winnipeg, MB

 Central Canada 
 Jennifer Carvalho (finalist 2013) – Toronto, ON
 Wallis Cheung –  Toronto, ON
 James Gardner – Toronto, ON
 Gavin Lynch – Ottawa, ON\
 Megan McCabe – Toronto, ON

 Eastern Canada 
 Carly Butler – Halifax, NS
 Teto Elsiddique – Halifax, NS
 Karine Fréchette – Montreal, QC
 Nicolas Lachance (Honourable mention) – Montreal, QC index no. 3 The book of Empathy, 2014
 Elysanne Tremblay – Montreal, QC

 Jury 
West
 Naomi Potter, Director and Curator, Esker Foundation, Calgary
 Melanie O'Brian, Director, SFU Galleries, Burnaby
 Catriona Jeffries, Owner and Director, Catriona Jeffries Gallery, Vancouver

Central
 Melissa Bennett, Curator of Contemporary Art, Art Gallery of Hamilton, Hamilton
 Robert Houle, Senior Artist, Toronto
 Will Kucey, Owner and Director, LE Gallery, Toronto

East
 Anthony Burnham, Artist, Montreal
 Mark Lanctôt, Curator, Musée d'art contemporain de Montréal, Montréal
 Deborah Carver, Owner and Director, Studio 21 Fine Art Gallery, Halifax

 2015 
 Finalists 
 Western 
Tristan Unrau – Vancouver, BC 
Robert Taite – Winnipeg, MB
Russell Leng – Vancouver, BC
Megan Hepburn – Vancouver, BC
Simon deBrée – Vancouver, BC/Stockholm, Sweden

 Central 
  Jessica Bell - Ottawa, ON
  Patrick Cruz (National winner) – Guelph (Ontario) for Time allergy, 2015
  Hanna Hur - Toronto, ON/Los Angeles, CA
  Caroline Larsen - Toronto, ON
  Claire Scherzinger (Honourable mention) – Toronto, ON for  My Contribution To The Many Paintings Of Pots And Plants, 2015

 Eastern 
Andrew Maize - Lunenberg, NS
John Player - Montreal, QC
Cindy Phenix - Montreal, QC
Paul Hardy - Montreal QC
Hangama Amiri (Honourable mention) – Halifax, NS Island of Dreams, 2015 Halifax, NS

 Jury 
 East 
 Hugues Charbonneau – Director, Galerie Hugues Charbonneau, Montreal
 Melanie Colosimo – Director, Anna Leonowens Gallery, NSCAD University, Halifax
 John Zeppetelli – Director & Chief Curator, Musée d’art contemporain de Montréal, Montreal

Central
 Iga Janik – Curator, Cambridge Galleries, Cambridge
 Georgiana Uhlyarik - Associate Curator, Canadian Art, Art Gallery of Ontario, Toronto
 Jinny Yu – Artist & Associate Professor, Department of Visual Arts, University of Ottawa, Ottawa

West
 Eli Bornowsky – Artist, RBC Canadian Painting Competition Finalist (2007, 2008, 2010), Vancouver
 Garry Neil Kennedy – Senior Artist, Vancouver
 Lisa Kehler – Director, Lisa Kehler Art + Projects, Winnipeg

 2016 
 Finalists 
 Western 
 Cameron Forbes (Honourable mention) – Saskatoon, SK for Maritime Plaza Hotel, Window Set 2, 2016
 Brian Hunter (National winner) – Winnipeg, MB for Two empty trays mounted vertically, 2015
 Brian Kokoska – Vancouver, BC/New York, NY for Dancing to the Silence of your Heartbeat, 2016[53]
 M.E. Sparks – Vancouver, BC for Afterimage, 2016
 Angela Teng – Vancouver, BC for Jump Shot, 2016

 Central 
 Wallis Cheung – Toronto, ON for Frame as void, 2016[54]
 Alex Fischer – Toronto, ON Pet, for Casper and Hesperi, 2016[54]
 Stephanie Hier – Toronto, ON for Break like the wind, 2015
 Hanna Hur – Los Angeles, CA for The Fool, 2016
 Keita Morimoto – Toronto, ON for Aya in Tokyo, 2015[54]

 Eastern 
 Nika Fontaine (Honourable mention) – Berlin, DE for Schnell Schnell, 2015
 Andrew Maize (2015 finalist) – Lunenburg, NS for THIS TOWN USED TO BE MOSTLY WHITE. NOW IT IS COLOURFUL, 2016
 Justine Skahan – Gatineau, QC for Home, 2016
 Geetha Thurairajah – Sackville, NB for Hotlines, 2016
 Ambera Wellmann – Guelph, ON for Wunde, 2015

 Jury 
 Western Canada 
 Sophie Brodovitch - Director, Equinox Gallery, Vancouver
 Tammi Campbell - Artist, Saskatoon
 Reid Shier - Director/Curator, Presentation House Gallery, Vancouver

 Central Canada 
 Kent Monkman - Artist, Toronto
 Georgia Scherman - Director, Georgia Scherman Projects, Toronto
 Beth Stuart - Artist & 2010 & 2011 RBC Canadian Painting Competition Alumni, Toronto

 Eastern Canada 
 Gemey Kelly - Director/Curator, Owens Gallery, Mt. Allison University, Sackville
 Harold Klunder - Artist, Montreal
Saelan Twerdy - Art Critic, Montreal

 2017 
 Finalists 
 Michael Freeman Badour for Patrick's Boots, 2017
 Amanda Boulos for Duckie Wants Water,  2017
 Teto Elsiddique (Honourable mention) –  Halifax, NS for neckrings, a breezy thing, 2017
 Cindy Ji Hye Kim for Conspiracy Theory,  2017
 David Kaarsemaker for Portage 1, 2017
 Wei Li for Obsessiveness and excitement, never growing out of them, 2017
 Laura Payne for Enneadec II, 2017
 Veronika Pausova  (Honourable mention) – Toronto, ON for Typography, 2017
 Laura Rokas-Bérubé for Paint by Number 7, 2017
 M.E. Sparks for Hollow Dog, 2017
 Kizi Spielmann Rose for Sun and a Tide Pool, 2017
 Angela Teng for Line Dance (Pink and Black for Mary Heilmann),  2016
 Joani Tremblay The Lure of the Local Senses of Place in a Multicentered Society, 2017
 Tristan Unrau for Nun, After Pasolini,  2017
 Ambera Wellman (Winner) – Guelph, ON for Temper Ripened, 2007

 2018 
 Finalists 
 Amanda Boulos (Winner) for In the Morning Keiran Brennan Hinton for Hotel Room Krystle Coughlin for Untitled Sarah Davidson for the garden at night Angela Fermor for Portrait 7, Torso Karine Fréchette for Croissance 1 Stephanie Hier for Walnuts and pears you plant for your heirs Ally McIntyre for Coyote Emmanuel Osahor (honourable mention) for Hiding Place Lauren Pelc-McArthur for Trop Trop geetha thurairajah (honourable mention) or A complicated relationship with our past makes for better stories of a future Kizi Spielmann Rose for Swallowtail Joani Tremblay for The Mind at Three Miles an Hour Tristan Unrau for Doggy Dog Afternoon Joy Wong for Cotton and Cheese 1''

Jury 
 Natasha Chaykowski
 Mark Igloliorte
 Crystal Mowry
 Erin Stump
 Alexandra McIntosh
 Julie Trudel
 Cynthia Daignault

See also 
 Sobey Art Award
 Governor General's Awards
 Audain Prize
 Scotiabank Photography Award
 Hnatyshyn Foundation Visual Arts Awards
 Joseph Plaskett Foundation Award

References 

Visual arts competitions
Canadian art awards